The Belstone Fox is a 1973 British film directed by James Hill, and based on David Rook's 1970 novel, The Ballad of the Belstone Fox.

Plot
The Belstone Fox is the nickname given to Tag, a fox cub rescued from the woods and adopted by huntsman Asher. The young fox is reared in captivity with a litter of hound puppies, including Merlin, with whom Tag becomes especially friendly. Asher and Tod are fascinated by Tag, who combines cool cunning and knowledge of human habitation to lead the pack and hunters in many a "merry chase." This gives the fox a status of local celebrity, enough to be published in magazines. Merlin, at first not interested in the hunts, becomes an active hound but protective of Tag. Asher, now an aging huntsman to the hunt club, was mildly protective of the fox until Tag leads the pack of hounds into the path of a train, killing many, and the club resolves to shoot the fox. Asher sees this as disturbing and against the natural order of life, and determines to bring down the fox in the approved manner, rather than with a firearm, however he dies from a sudden heart attack while attempting to do the deed. His once beloved fox and its friend Merlin sit beside their master until the rescue party comes.

Cast
Eric Porter – Asher
Jeremy Kemp – Kendrick
Bill Travers – Tod
Rachel Roberts – Cathie
Dennis Waterman – Stephen
Heather Wright – Jenny

Production

The Belstone Fox was mostly filmed in Somerset, on and near the Quantock Hills, with some additional filming on Dartmoor. The scene where Tag rests on a tomb in the church yard was filmed at the Church of St Peter and St Paul, Over Stowey, Somerset. Many of the extras were members of the West Somerset Vale Hunt. The setting for the "Lawn Meet" at the Master's home was the nearby Barford Park. The scene where the hounds are led into the train tracks was filmed on a stretch of the West Somerset Railway, and was filmed in reverse and then played backward in order to get a realistic sense of the train colliding with the pack of hounds.

Critical reception
Time Out called the film "a dismayingly literal and unimaginative version of David Rook's novel," ; the Radio Times gave it two out of five stars, calling it a "workmanlike adaptation," adding, "Porter and Rachel Roberts acquit themselves adequately but the film ultimately impresses more for its wildlife photography than for its dramatic interest," ; whereas TV Guide gave the film three out of four stars, writing, "Porter is solid as the hunter who brings the baby fox to the hound for nurturing. Hats off to the trainers and technical experts who let the animals steal the show." ; and Britmovie described it as a "touching tale," adding, "Eric Porter as Asher and Rachel Roberts as his wife are first-rate."

Home media
The movie has been released a few times in PAL format, changing the film's running time from 103 minutes to 98 minutes. A Region 1 American DVD was released in 2013 as the 40th Anniversary Edition. It is merely reformatted from the PAL video, but at 98 minutes, still plays faster. At 103 minutes, the 2017 Blu-ray from Network UK is the correct film speed transfer but is Region B locked.

Original novel

The cover art for the 40th Anniversary Edition DVD includes the captions "The Original Timeless Tale of True Friendship" and "The Story that Inspired The Fox and the Hound", in reference to the 1981 Disney film. This is at odds with Disney crediting Daniel P. Mannix's 1967 novel, The Fox and the Hound, as the source material for their film. Nevertheless, David Rook's 1970 novel and James Hill's 1973 film do bear similarities in outline to the earlier Mannix novel. In both, a red fox kit is reared by a hunter after his family is killed. The fox later returns to the wild and eludes a hunter and his hounds by running the rails just before a train is due. This results in an accident that motivates the hunter to track the fox for vengeance. There are also marked differences however. In the Mannix novel, the hunter who raises the fox is different from the hunter who swears vengeance upon him. In the Rook novel, the hunter who takes in the fox is the same as the one who later swears vengeance. Also in the Rook novel, multiple hounds die in the train accident, while in Mannix's novel, only the hunter's favorite hound is killed. Another notable difference is that in the Mannix novel, the main hound who the hunter uses to track the offending fox has no prior relationship to that fox. In Rook's novel, this fox and hound are childhood friends, which is in keeping with Disney's 1981 adaptation of The Fox and the Hound, but deviates from Mannix's source material.

The ending of Mannix's novel and The Belstone Fox film are similar to each other, though inverted. In the Mannix novel, the now elderly fox drops dead when the hound chases him to the point of exhaustion. While the hound initially lives, the hunter must later euthanize him upon being forced into a nursing home. In James Hill's film, the fox and the hound reconcile with each other and survive but the hunter himself drops dead of a sudden heart attack while pursuing the fox. Meanwhile, the Disney version of The Fox and the Hound ends with the hunter giving up his quest for vengeance after the fox and the hound reconcile once the fox saves the hunter's life. The ending varies in different editions of Rook's novel, with some versions being closer to the Disney film. A British edition of the novel entitled The Belstone Fox to tie in with the film largely ends as Rook's picture does. There is the slight difference that the hunter dies from pneumonia after collapsing of exhaustion rather than a heart attack, despite the best efforts of both the fox and the hound to keep him warm using their body heat. An American edition of the tie-in novel carries the alternative title Free Spirit and is closer to the Disney version of The Fox and the Hound. In Free Spirit, the hunter gives up his quest for vengeance after the fox and the hound save the hunter's life by successfully insulating him.

See also
 The Fox and the Hound, a 1967 novel by Daniel P. Mannix with similar themes

References

External links

1973 films
British children's films
Fictional foxes
Films about foxes
Films directed by James Hill (British director)
Films scored by Laurie Johnson
1970s children's films
1970s English-language films
1970s British films